Arthur Haden Causer (1884–1927) was an English professional footballer who played as a goalkeeper in the Football League for Glossop and Preston North End.

Personal life 
Causer served in the Royal Field Artillery and the Labour Corps during the First World War.

Career statistics

References

English footballers
English Football League players
British Army personnel of World War I
1884 births
1927 deaths
Association football goalkeepers
Footballers from Wolverhampton
Telford United F.C. players
Glossop North End A.F.C. players
Preston North End F.C. players
Shrewsbury Town F.C. players
Royal Field Artillery soldiers
Royal Pioneer Corps soldiers
Military personnel from Staffordshire